Cabo Raso (Cape Raso) is a cape along the coast of Cascais in western coastal Portugal.

See also
 Cabo Raso Lighthouse

References

Lisboa Region

Raso